Elphin (which possibly derives from a combination of Norse and Gaelic fjell, "cliff" or "rock", and fionn, "bright") is a crofting township in Assynt, in the Sutherland area of Highland in Scotland. The village contains a telephone box, a post box, a tearoom, a Scottish Mountaineering Club Hut, Grampian Speleological Group Hut, a small caravan site and many self-catering options. Assynt Primary School closed in 2001, and the building is now a community hall operated by Elphin Ledmore and Knockan Community Association Limited. The township now has its own website, see external links.

Notable people

Rev Prof G. N. M. Collins DD, twice Moderator of the General Assembly of the Free Church of Scotland was raised in Elphin

References

External links
Elphin community website
Elphin Tearooms

Populated places in Sutherland